Guilherme da Mata Oliveira (born 12 April 1995) is a Portuguese professional footballer who plays for C.F. Os Belenenses as a goalkeeper.

Club career
Born in the village of Venda do Pinheiro in Mafra, Lisbon District, Oliveira was in Sporting CP's academy from 2004. He made his professional debut for the reserves on 15 February 2015 in a 4–0 away loss against C.D. Aves in Segunda Liga, his sole appearance of the season.

After two more games the following campaign, Oliveira was loaned to C.D. Cova da Piedade in the same league. He played only two competitive matches during his tenure, both in the Taça de Portugal; the second was on 19 November 2016, a 2–0 defeat at Primeira Liga side G.D. Estoril Praia in the fourth round.

Oliveira spent 2017–18 on loan at Associação Académica de Coimbra, also of division two. On 1 July 2018, he signed for Belenenses SAD on a contract until 2021. He made his top-flight debut for the latter club as a substitute for Cleylton the following 5 May, when the regular starter Muriel was sent off in the 22nd minute of an 8–1 home loss to Sporting.

In August 2019, Oliveira was loaned to C.D. Fátima in the third tier. He continued to play at that level the following seasons, with Louletano DC, S.C.U. Torreense, AD Fafe and C.F. Os Belenenses.

References

External links

Portuguese League profile 

1995 births
Living people
People from Mafra, Portugal
Sportspeople from Lisbon District
Portuguese footballers
Association football goalkeepers
Primeira Liga players
Liga Portugal 2 players
Campeonato de Portugal (league) players
Sporting CP B players
C.D. Cova da Piedade players
Associação Académica de Coimbra – O.A.F. players
Belenenses SAD players
C.D. Fátima players
Louletano D.C. players
S.C.U. Torreense players
AD Fafe players
C.F. Os Belenenses players
Portugal youth international footballers